The women's high jump event at the 2017 European Athletics U23 Championships was held in Bydgoszcz, Poland, at Zdzisław Krzyszkowiak Stadium on 14 and 16 July.

Medalists

Results

Qualification
14 July

Qualification rule: 1.82 (Q) or the 12 best results (q) qualified for the final.

Final
16 July

References

High jump
High jump at the European Athletics U23 Championships